James Alexander Kirton (born 10 April 1985) is a British former competitive swimmer who specialised in breaststroke events.

Kirton represented Great Britain at the 2008 Summer Olympics in the 200-metre breaststroke swimming event.

External links
British Olympic Association athlete profile
British Swimming athlete profile

1985 births
Living people
English male swimmers
Olympic swimmers of Great Britain
Swimmers at the 2008 Summer Olympics